Antonio García Torres (born 11 October 1943) is a Mexican politician affiliated with the Institutional Revolutionary Party. As of 2014 he served as Senator of the LVIII and LIX Legislatures of the Mexican Congress representing Michoacán.

References

1943 births
Living people
Politicians from Michoacán
People from Zitácuaro
Members of the Senate of the Republic (Mexico)
Institutional Revolutionary Party politicians
21st-century Mexican politicians
National Autonomous University of Mexico alumni
Academic staff of Universidad Autónoma del Estado de Hidalgo